Enrique Cubas (born 21 March 1974) is a Peruvian wrestler. He competed in the men's freestyle 62 kg at the 1996 Summer Olympics.

References

External links
 

1974 births
Living people
Peruvian male sport wrestlers
Olympic wrestlers of Peru
Wrestlers at the 1996 Summer Olympics
Place of birth missing (living people)
Pan American Games silver medalists for Peru
Pan American Games medalists in wrestling
Medalists at the 1999 Pan American Games
Wrestlers at the 1999 Pan American Games
20th-century Peruvian people
21st-century Peruvian people